Strobl (or Strobl am Wolfgangsee) is a municipality of the Salzburg-Umgebung District (Flachgau), in the northeastern portion of the Austrian state of Salzburg, right on the border with Upper Austria. It comprises the Katastralgemeinden of Aigen, Gschwendt, Strobl, and Weißenbach.

Geography
It lies on the eastern side of lake Wolfgangsee in the Salzkammergut resort region, close to Sankt Gilgen and the Upper Austrian municipalities of St. Wolfgang and Bad Ischl. The town has a population of 3,453 (2001) and an area of 93.89 km2. Both the main road (No. 158), from Salzburg and St. Gilgen to Bad Ischl, and the road to St. Wolfgang pass on the edge of Strobl so there is no through traffic. There are several villages around the lake - the main ones being St. Wolfgang im Salzkammergut, and St. Gilgen at the other end of the Wolfgangsee, plus the hamlet of Weissenbach bei Strobl. 

A small steamer operates on the lake. Also in Strobl, the University of Vienna operates the Bundesinstitut für Erwachsenenbildung, an adult-education institution, and a frequent location for academic conferences or for the Summer School for International and European Studies. Another famous event is the yearly "Voice of Strobl" song contest at the lake. There is a promenade on the lakeshore, where one can see sculpture by Toni Schneider-Manzell, :de:Toni Schneider-Manzell, Ilse Sprohar, and Eva Mazzucco.

The famous town of St. Wolfgang is within hiking distance, and common excursions from Strobl include the Postalm plateau and the Schafberg (1783m), which can be ascended via a cog railway, the Schafbergbahn, as well as Bad Ischl, where Emperor Franz Joseph I of Austria often spent his summers. The Laimer Family folk musicians are a local attraction. The area is popular for hiking and watersports in the summer, for skiing in the winter, and is well-served by pensions and hotels. The former Salzkammergut-Lokalbahn narrow gauge railway to Salzburg went out of service in 1957.

History
The name Strobl originally meant "scrubby" or "unkempt"; the town's name goes back to the 14th century, when the Wolfgangsee was known as the Abersee, and one Friedrich Stroblo appears as the owner of a Seegea fishpond or weir. Wolf Strobl took over property from the Laimer family about 1553, which became known as Am Schober, an inn which provided the basis for the later settlement's first given official mention in 1593, in connection with Hanns III Strobl, who was a local official and tavernkeeper in 1587. Later, Joseph Sigmund Berchtold und Sonnenburg married into the Strobl family and came into the property. Nonetheless, the name "Strobl" was firmly attached to the area around the Am Schober inn. The first lane as one enters the town from the east is still called the "Schoberweg".

Around 1800, with the expansion of post and stagecoach lines, the Platzlhof inn was established as a station on the Postal line of Thurn und Taxis. Due to its picturesque setting the village prospered from 1877 to 1890 with tourist trade spilling over from Bad Ischl. The author Hugo von Hofmannsthal spent his vacations at Strobl and around 1900, it became a residence of Baron Gecmen-Waldeck, whose family industries generated enormous wealth, and supported a sumptuous residence in Hietzing (Vienna) as well as vast properties in Bohemia. During this period as well Strobl regularly hosted events for the aristocracy and high bourgeoise summering in Bad Ischl. After the Second World War, a portion of the estate was converted into the Kurhotel Schloss Strobl.

After World War I Strobl became a popular summer resort for film stars like Emil Jannings and Theo Lingen. Princess Marie Vassiltchikov, in her memoir Berlin Diaries, mentions stopping in Strobl during her flight after the July 20 Plot against Adolf Hitler.

In the last days of World War II, King Leopold III of Belgium and Princess Lilian were interned at Strobl, closely guarded by a Waffen-SS contingent. Immediately upon the King being liberated by the US Army, his brother Prince Charles and Belgian PM Achille Van Acker arrived in Strobl to confront the King with allegations of his having collaborated with the Nazi occupation in its earlier stages; the hot controversy known as "The Royal Question", which was to dominate Belgian politics until 1950, can thus be said to have started in the Austrian town.  
 
The town was in the US zone of Allied-occupied Austria after the war, where the villa of the Viennese banking family Deutsch (expropriated by the Nazis in 1938) served as an officers' club. Strobl was the site of a Displaced Persons camp. In 2008, the Cultural Center which now occupies the villa presented a historical exhibition on local resistance to the Nazis.

St. Sigismund Parish Church

Strobl has an attractive church (:de:Pfarrkirche St. Sigismund (Strobl)), where Prince Tassilo von Fürstenberg (:de:Tassilo von Fürstenberg) is buried.

In 1758 the archbishop Sigismund III (Christoph von Schrattenbach) commissioned Kassian Singer, master builder from Kitzbühel, to build a church in the village. Singer died before the completion of the project, which was given to Palier Andrä Huber of St. Gilgen. The church was dedicated to the archbishop's patron saint on May 3, 1761.

The building's original late Baroque appearance is maintained in virtually pristine condition. The high altar painting, by Johann Benedikt Werkstätter (:de:Benedikt Werkstätter), depicts St. Sigmund along with the Holy Trinity. There are also statues of St. Christopher and St. Joseph by Sebastian Eberl. The high altar and tabernacle were made by Lorenz Hörmbler. On the left side-altar is depicted Our Lady of Good Counsel, and on the right, St. Francis de Sales, painted by Peter Anton Lorenzoni.

A new organ (built by Orgelbau Felsberg) was dedicated in 2003.

Politics
Seats in the municipal assembly (Gemeinderat) as of 2009 elections:
 Austrian People's Party (ÖVP): 13
 Social Democratic Party of Austria (SPÖ): 6
 Freedom Party of Austria (FPÖ): 2

Notable residents
 Hugo von Hofmannsthal chose Strobl as his favorite retreat.
 Strobl was the summer home of the actor Emil Jannings from 1929, and his primary residence after 1945, where he died in 1950.
 After the deposition of the Nazi officials in May 1945, the actor Theo Lingen served a few days as de facto mayor of the town.
 In spring 1945 King Leopold III of Belgium was held here as a prisoner of war with his family by 200 men of the Waffen-SS until he was freed by the 106th Cavalry Group of the US Army in May 1945.
 In 1973 Hildegard Knef lived at the Hubertushof hunting lodge of Prince Fürstenberg.
 Helene Thimig actress and wife of theatre director Max Reinhardt, lived more than 20 years in Strobl. She is memorialized by a bust on the Promenade.

References

External links

  Strobl official site
 Webcam on the village square

Cities and towns in Salzburg-Umgebung District